This is a partial list of religious groups in Korea.

Buddhist

 Jogye Order
 Cheontae
 Taego Order
 Won Buddhism

Christian

 Anglican Church of Korea
 Catholic Church in South Korea
 Christian Congregation of Jehovah's Witnesses
 The Church of Jesus Christ of Latter-day Saints in South Korea
 Korea Baptist Convention
 Korea Campus Crusade for Christ
 Korean Orthodox Church
 Presbyterian Church of Korea
 Providence
 Unification Church
 All Nations Church
 World Mission Society Church of God

Other
 Bocheon-gyo
 Cheondogyo
 Daesun Jinrihoe
 Jeung San Do
 Jeungsanism
 Juche
 Muism
 Taejonggyo

See also
 Hinduism in South Korea
 Islam in Korea
 Korean Confucianism
 Religion in Korea
 Religion in North Korea
 Religion in South Korea
 Taoism in Korea

External links
http://www.dlibrary.go.kr/JavaClient/jsp/wonmun/full2.jsp?v_kw_str=(韓國新宗敎實態調査報告書)&v_db=4&v_doc_no=104211&mode=1

Religious groups